Marc Gicquel was the defending champion but chose to compete at the 2013 BNP Paribas Masters.

Malek Jaziri won the title, defeating Jan-Lennard Struff 6–4, 6–3 in the final.

Seeds

Draw

Finals

Top half

Bottom half

References
 Main Draw
 Qualifying Draw

Geneva Open Challenger - Singles
2013 Singles